Ram Prakash Mahto is an Indian politician from the state of Bihar. He has represented the Katihar legislative assembly constituency in Bihar Vidhan Sabha. Mahto is a member of Rashtriya Janata Dal but he has also been a member of Nationalist Congress Party  and Janata Dal in past.

Political career
Mahto started his political career in 1990. He was a member of Janata Dal. In election to Bihar Legislative Assembly, Mahto defeated Jagbandhu Adhikari of Bhartiya Janata Party and reached Vidhan Sabha for the first time. He continued his winning streak from the same seat in 2000 too and was made the cabinet minister in the government of Rashtriya Janata Dal. He was allotted the portfolio of education ministry. In 2005, though Rashtriya Janata Dal won the elections once again but government couldn't be formed and Mahto also lost his seat to Tarkishore Prasad of Bhartiya Janata Party.

References

Living people
Rashtriya Janata Dal politicians
Bihar MLAs 1990–1995
Bihar MLAs 2000–2005
Year of birth missing (living people)